The Pulse EP is an EP released by The Future Sound of London partly under the alias Indo Tribe, two tracks under that name, and the other two are FSOL tracks. One FSOL track ("Pulse State") is from their first album Accelerator and one of the Indo Tribe tracks ("In The Mind of a Child") is from the 1992 compilation album Earthbeat.

Track listing
 Bring In The Pulse (MFK Mix) - Indo Tribe
 Producer - Mental Cube
 In The Mind Of A Child (First Born Mix) - Indo Tribe
 Producer - Mental Cube  
 Hardhead (Frothin' At The Mouth Mix) - FSOL
 Producer - Yage  
 Pulse State (831 AM Mix) - FSOL
 Producer - Yage

Crew
Written By Brian Dougans, Garry Cobain

References

External links
 

1991 EPs
The Future Sound of London EPs